Olof Thiel (October 31, 1892 – December 10, 1978) was a Swedish film producer, film production manager, and composer. As a composer, he most often used the pseudonym "Jacques Armand." He also wrote some of the lyrics to his melodies.

Family
Otto Thiel was the son of Ernest Thiel (1859–1947) and Anna Fredrika Josephson. His father Ernest created the Thiel Gallery art museum, which is one of the foremost museums in Stockholm. Otto Thiel's daughter Madeleine Uggla was a singing teacher and the mother of the actor Magnus Uggla.

Career
Thiel was one of the directors of the company Filmaktiebolaget Biörnstad & Thiel, and he started the film company AB Irefilm. He composed the music for almost all of Irefilm's film productions.

Film music (selected)
 A Stolen Waltz (1932)
 Fantegutten (1932)
 Flickan från varuhuset (1933)
 Ä' vi gifta? (1936)
 The Ghost of Bragehus (1936)
 Poor Millionaires (1936)
 En sjöman går iland (1937)
 Witches' Night (1937)
 Happy Vestköping (1937)
 En flicka kommer till sta'n (1937)
  Career (1938)
  Comrades in Uniform (1938)

Films directed
1934: Synnöve Solbakken
1935: Kanske en gentleman
1936: Stackars miljonärer
1939: Midnattssolens son

References

External links

Olof Thiel at the Swedish Film Database
Olof Thiel at the Czecho-Slovak Film Database

1892 births
1978 deaths
Swedish male composers
Swedish film producers